Timothy James O'Shea (born 12 November 1966 in Pimlico) is a former professional footballer who played as a defender. He is the assistant manager of Cray Wanderers. He represented the Republic of Ireland at the 1985 FIFA World Youth Championship. His clubs included Tottenham Hotspur, Leyton Orient and Gillingham, where he made over 100 Football League appearances.

Career
While playing for Instant-Dict in the Hong Kong league, he played three matches for the Hong Kong League team in the Dynasty Cup. As the Hong Kong team consisted of top players in the local league, including foreigners such as O'Shea, it was not an official match of the Hong Kong FA.

On 21 February 2008, Grays Athletic appointed O'Shea as a senior coach to assist Micky Woodward and Gary Phillips with fitness and tactics. On 15 September 2008, he was appointed as manager after chairman Micky Woodward stepped down, but held the post only until the arrival of Wayne Burnett as manager two weeks later.

He moved from Grays to take the position at Croydon Athletic. Under O'Shea, the Rams were promoted to the Isthmian League Premier Division. O'Shea resigned from Croydon on 4 September 2010, after the team's owner Mazhar Majeed was alleged to have been involved in spot fixing in Pakistan cricket matches, resulting in HM Revenue and Customs officials investigating the club. On 25 October 2010, O'Shea was appointed first-team manager of Lewes. He left at the end of the 2010–11 season after Lewes were relegated.

When Neil Smith was appointed as manager of Cray Wanderers in March 2022, he confirmed that O'Shea would be his assistant.

References

1966 births
Living people
People from Pimlico
Republic of Ireland association footballers
English footballers
Hong Kong footballers
Footballers from the City of Westminster
Association football defenders
Hong Kong international footballers
Republic of Ireland under-21 international footballers
English Football League players
Hong Kong First Division League players
Brentford F.C. players
Welling United F.C. players
Farnborough F.C. players
Gillingham F.C. players
Tottenham Hotspur F.C. players
Newport County A.F.C. players
Leyton Orient F.C. players
Double Flower FA players
Eastern Sports Club footballers
English football managers
National League (English football) managers
Grays Athletic F.C. managers
Lewes F.C. managers
English expatriate footballers
English expatriate sportspeople in Hong Kong
Expatriate footballers in Hong Kong